Rodney Davies is a rugby union player.

Rodney Davies may also refer to:

Rod Davies (1930–2015), radio astronomer
Rod Davies (sailor) (born 1969), Canadian Olympic sailor
Rodney Mark Davies, writer of the song "Breathe You In"

See also
Rodney Davis (disambiguation)